André Filipe Saraiva Martins (born 26 March 1987) is a Portuguese former footballer who played as a forward.

Football career
Martins was born in Ferreira do Alentejo, Beja District. After starting his football formation at local Sporting Clube Ferreirense, he finished it at C.F. Os Belenenses and Associação Naval 1º de Maio; in the 2006–07 season he trained briefly with the first team of the latter, but eventually did not make his Primeira Liga debut.

Subsequently, Martins' career took him to several countries and leagues: in summer 2007 he had an unsuccessful trial in Scotland with Dundee United, then played a couple of months in England with Fulham's reserves.
 
In the following years, Martins represented in quick succession PFC Vidima-Rakovski Sevlievo in Bulgaria, Chiapas in Mexico, Venezuela's Caracas F.C. and Club Bolívar from Bolivia. In early 2010, he was loaned to Finnish club IFK Mariehamn.

In early 2012, Martins signed with Syrianska FC from the Swedish Allsvenskan for six months, being released shortly after. In November of that year he joined Inverness Caledonian Thistle in the Scottish Premier League, but left the following month after only one appearance as an unused substitute.

References

External links

1987 births
Living people
Portuguese footballers
Association football forwards
Associação Naval 1º de Maio players
PFC Vidima-Rakovski Sevlievo players
Liga MX players
Chiapas F.C. footballers
Caracas FC players
Club Bolívar players
Veikkausliiga players
IFK Mariehamn players
Syrianska FC players
Inverness Caledonian Thistle F.C. players
Portuguese expatriate footballers
Expatriate footballers in England
Expatriate footballers in Bulgaria
Expatriate footballers in Mexico
Expatriate footballers in Venezuela
Expatriate footballers in Bolivia
Expatriate footballers in Finland
Expatriate footballers in Sweden
Expatriate footballers in Scotland
Portuguese expatriate sportspeople in Bulgaria
Sportspeople from Beja District